Kryazhevoye is a rural locality (a selo) and the administrative center of Kryazhevinsky Selsoviet, Limansky District, Astrakhan Oblast, Russia. The population was 658 as of 2010. There are 12 streets.

Geography 
Kryazhevoye is located 28 km northeast of Liman (the district's administrative centre) by road. Oranzherei is the nearest rural locality.

References 

Rural localities in Limansky District